Atarashii Gakko! (stylized in all caps), known in Japan as Atarashii Gakkou no Leaders (Japanese: 新しい学校のリーダーズ; lit.: New School Leaders), is a Japanese girl group formed in 2015. The group is affiliated with Asobisystem.

Atarashii Gakko! made its Japanese debut in June 2017 under Victor Entertainment with the single Dokubana. The group made its worldwide debut in January 2021 under 88rising with the single Nainainai.

Members

Discography

Singles

Albums

Extended plays

Music videos

Filmography

Animation 
 SNS Police (2018) as anonymous (Rin) in episode 1, Taguchi's mother (Suzuka) in episode 3, Gorgonzola (Mizyu) in episode 5, Puppy (KC) (Kanon) in episode 5, and Gorilla (Rin) in episode 6

Television

Web

See also
List of J-pop concerts held outside Asia

References

External links 

 Official English website

Japanese girl groups
J-pop music groups
Musical groups established in 2015
Japanese pop music groups
2015 establishments in Japan
Japanese jazz musicians
Musical quartets